Nettlestead may refer to:

 Nettlestead, Kent
 Nettlestead, Suffolk